Michael Francis Farley (March 1, 1863 – October 8, 1921) was an American businessman and politician who served one term as a U.S. Representative from New York from 1915 to 1917.

Early life and career 
Farley was born in Birr, County Offaly, Ireland on March 1, 1863.  He immigrated to the United States in 1881, and lived in Brooklyn and New York City.

Farley became the owner and operator of a tavern on West 22nd Street in New York City, and was later president of the Wine and Liquor Dealers Association of New York County and Manhattan's Central Association of Liquor Dealers.

Tenure in Congress 
He was elected to the 64th United States Congress as a Democrat, and served from March 4, 1915, to March 3, 1917.  Farley was defeated for reelection in 1916 by Fiorello H. La Guardia.

Gore-McLemore resolution 
In Congress Farley was a proponent of the 1916 Gore-McLemore Resolution.  This resolution followed the German Empire's announcement that it would sink armed enemy merchant ships without warning, and was intended to prevent the United States from being drawn into World War I.  As introduced, the Gore-McLemore Resolution asked American citizens not to travel on the armed vessels of any belligerent, and asked for the Secretary of State to refuse to issue passports to Americans intending to travel on such ships.  President Woodrow Wilson opposed the resolution, arguing that travel restrictions were an infringement on the rights of individual Americans. The Resolution was tabled by both the House and Senate.

Death and burial
On October 8, 1921, Farley died as the result of exposure to anthrax contracted from his shaving brush.  Upon becoming ill he sought treatment at a hospital and received anti-anthrax serum, but the treatment was unsuccessful.  His death publicized the fact that New York public health officials had been waging a campaign to prevent the importation of infected hides and animal hair products.  These products, including shaving brushes and toothbrushes, caused 11 deaths in the New York area.

Farley was buried in Calvary Cemetery in Queens, New York.

References

External links

1863 births
1921 deaths
20th-century American politicians
20th-century American businesspeople
Burials at Calvary Cemetery (Queens)
Politicians from Brooklyn
Irish emigrants to the United States (before 1923)
Drinking establishment owners
Democratic Party members of the United States House of Representatives from New York (state)
Deaths from anthrax
Infectious disease deaths in New York (state)
People from Birr, County Offaly
American drink industry businesspeople
American people of World War I